The Frederick Apartments is a historic apartment building located in Charlotte, Mecklenburg County, North Carolina. It was built in 1927, and is a three-story, 36-unit brick apartment house in the Italian Renaissance Revival style.  The body of the building is constructed of red brick, laid up in common bond. The facade features buff-colored brick set in stretcher bond with decorative patterning in places.

It was added to the National Register of Historic Places in 2001.

References

Apartment buildings in North Carolina
Residential buildings on the National Register of Historic Places in North Carolina
Residential buildings completed in 1927
Renaissance Revival architecture in North Carolina
Buildings and structures in Charlotte, North Carolina
National Register of Historic Places in Mecklenburg County, North Carolina